Robert "Tarzan" Holt was a college football player and high school football coach. He once coached high school football at Tellico Plains, Tennessee. He also coached under Bill Brennan at Little Rock College.

University of Tennessee
Holt was a prominent end for the Tennessee Volunteers football team of the University of Tennessee from 1920 to 1923. Coach M. B. Banks moved him to the position from the backfield.

1922
He was selected All-Southern in 1922.

1923
Holt was elected captain of 1923.

References

Year of birth missing
Year of death missing
American football ends
American football fullbacks
Tennessee Volunteers football players
High school football coaches in Tennessee
All-Southern college football players